Tim Palmer, born in Nottingham, England, is a British film historian currently based at the University of North Carolina at Wilmington in the film studies department. He holds a bachelor's degree (with honors) in film and literature from the University of Warwick, a master's degree in film and television studies from the University of Warwick, and a PhD in communication arts (film track) from the University of Wisconsin–Madison.

His primary research areas include contemporary French cinema and women in the French film industry. His first monograph, Brutal Intimacy: Analyzing Contemporary French Cinema (Wesleyan University Press, 2011), introduced the idea of the contemporary French film industry as an ecosystem, considering how it intersects with le jeune cinéma français, first-time directors, cinéma du corps (a more materials-based interrogation of the New French Extremity), pop-art cinema, female authorship, cinephilia, and La Fémis. His second monograph, Irreversible (Palgrave Macmillan, 2015), is a textual and formal analysis of Gaspar Noé's infamous 2002 rape and revenge film Irréversible.

He has also published articles and co-edited (with Charlie Michael) a volume on French cinema, Directory of World Cinema: France (University of Chicago Press/Intellect, 2013), exploring such topics as: Paule Delsol, Marina de Van, Valérie Donzelli, Jean-Paul Civeyrac, Jean-Pierre Melville, Mia Hansen-Løve, Philippe Grandrieux, Claire Denis, Valeria Bruni Tedeschi, La France, Jean Dujardin, Bruno Dumont, Water Lilies, Catherine Breillat, Marjane Satrapi, and Céline Sciamma.

Palmer is founding co-editor-in-chief of the journal Film Matters—written and peer reviewed by undergraduate students—which has been profiled nationally by The Chronicle of Higher Education and the podcast Aca-Media, as well as various local publications.

He has been consulted by the Los Angeles Times for articles on Frank Capra Jr. and Catherine Deneuve, and has been interviewed by The Chronicle of Higher Education, Film International, Film Matters, as well as WHQR and UNCW.

His work has been supported by the National Endowment for the Humanities and the American Council of Learned Societies.

References 

Living people
Writers from Nottingham
British film historians
University of North Carolina at Wilmington faculty
Alumni of the University of Warwick
University of Wisconsin–Madison alumni
1975 births